Médon is a town in south-western Ivory Coast. It is a sub-prefecture of Sassandra Department in Gbôklé Region, Bas-Sassandra District.

Médon was a commune until March 2012, when it became one of 1126 communes nationwide that were abolished.

In 2014, the population of the sub-prefecture of Médon was 16,575 .

Villages
The four villages of the sub-prefecture of Médon and their population in 2014 are :
 Garoubré (5 179)
 Gréguibré (3 685)
 Inahiri (4 243)
 Médon (3 468)

References

Sub-prefectures of Gbôklé
Former communes of Ivory Coast